The Harper County Courthouse in Buffalo, Oklahoma, built in 1927, was Harper County's first courthouse building. It was listed on the National Register of Historic Places in 1984.

It is a red brick three-story Plains Commercial style structure. It has paired Ionic pilasters bracketing the central windows of its second and third floors, above the front entrance. The entrance is topped by a broken pediment with a carved stone escutcheon.

References

National Register of Historic Places in Harper County, Oklahoma
Neoclassical architecture in Oklahoma
Government buildings completed in 1927
Harper County, Oklahoma